Shirley-Ann Bonaparte (born 5 February 1956) is a Trinidadian former cricketer who played as a left-handed batter and medium pace bowler. She appeared in three Test matches and two One Day Internationals for the West Indies in 1979, with a Test high score of 61. She played domestic cricket for Trinidad and Tobago.

References

External links
 
 

1956 births
Living people
West Indian women cricketers
West Indies women Test cricketers
West Indies women One Day International cricketers
Trinidad and Tobago women cricketers